Haunted Kids (also known as Haunted Kids: True Ghost Stories) is a series of children's allegedly true ghost story books written by Allan Zullo and Bruce Nash, (creators of Haunted Lives: True Ghost Stories.) Unlike many anthology ghost story books at the time, these stories are all non-fiction and based on alleged real cases; stories all involve children who have had encounters with the supernatural.The series was enormously popular, publishing millions of copies and eleven initial volumes between 1993 and 1997.

Overview
Starting in the 2000s, the series was republished by Scholastic.
The first volume in the series was released on audiobook in 2006, narrated by John Ratzenberger.
The series spawned several spin-offs, all involving haunted locations, written by Allan Zullo.
A boxed set was released in 2008, containing six volumes from the book series and a skull pendant.

Haunted Kids series

Related titles by Zullo

See also

Allan Zullo
Bruce Nash
Haunted Lives: True Ghost Stories
Scary Stories to Tell in the Dark
Short & Shivery

References 

Series of children's books
Horror short story collections
1993 short story collections